Herzog–Jackson Motorsports was a NASCAR Busch Series team based in Charlotte, North Carolina. Originating as Herzog Motorsports, the team was owned by Bill, Randy, and Stan Herzog. In its final year, the team was co-owned by former Oakland A's and New York Yankees player Reggie Jackson. The team is notable for fielding future NASCAR National Series champions Todd Bodine and Jimmie Johnson.

SODA
Herzog Motorsports started as an off-road racing team. The team won the 1998 SODA Pro-2 (rear wheel drive) championship with rookie driver Ricky Johnson. Johnson won 6 of 16 events.

NASCAR Busch Series
HJM debuted in 1999 as Herzog Motorsports with SODA and American Speed Association driver Jimmie Johnson, who had previously worked with them in SODA. The team ran full-time in 2000, sponsored by wireless company Alltel. Johnson would finish 10th in the points and place third in the 2000 Rookie of the Year points, behind Ron Hornaday Jr. and Kevin Harvick. Johnson's rookie year was notable for a crash at Watkins Glen International, where his brakes failed heading into turn 1 and he slammed the barrier head on. He was not injured and even pumped his fists after exiting the car. After Alltel left for Penske Racing, Johnson remained with the team for 2001, sponsored by Excedrin. Johnson gave the team its first ever win at the inaugural race at Chicagoland Speedway. Herzog's plans were to field a Cup team with Johnson, but he had already signed a deal with Hendrick Motorsports for 2002. Herzog then turned to Todd Bodine. Bodine would take the team's second win at Kentucky Speedway and finished 23rd in points. After Excedrin's departure, Herzog Motorsports joined with former baseball player Reggie Jackson to form Herzog–Jackson Motorsports in 2003. With Bodine back at the wheel, the team took its third and final victory at Darlington Raceway. Despite the added presence of fame, the team had sponsors for a few races, but could not attract a major sponsor to pay the bills, despite Bodine leading the points. Troubles were evident when the team skipped the Chicago race and Bodine was released. HJM returned at Kansas with Jeff Green, who finished 11th. Before shutting down, they ran one more race with Green at Homestead, finishing 27th.

Busch Series results

References

External links

Auto racing teams established in 2000
Auto racing teams disestablished in 2003
Companies based in Charlotte, North Carolina
Defunct NASCAR teams
American auto racing teams
Defunct companies based in North Carolina